Oran is a city in Algeria.

Oran may also refer to:

Places
 Oran Province, Algeria
 Oran (department) 1848–1974
 Oran 1 University
 Orán Department, Argentina
 San Ramón de la Nueva Orán, or simply Orán, a city 
 Orán Airport
 Oran, India
Oran, Iowa, U.S.
Oran, Missouri, U.S.
Oran, New York, U.S.
Oran, Ohio, U.S.
Oran, Texas, U.S.
Oran Township, Fayette County, Iowa, U.S.
Oran Township, Logan County, Illinois, U.S.
 Oran (state constituency), in Perlis, Malaysia

People
 Oran (name), list of people with the name

Other uses
Oran Berry, an item in Pokémon games
 O-RAN, open radio access network

See also

 Odhrán
 Oran Park (disambiguation)
 Orin (disambiguation)